The Ministry of Finance and Economic Development is a ministry within the cabinet of the Government of Ethiopia. It is responsible for general financial management and economic policy of Ethiopia, in addition to the allocation of economic assistance. Formerly the Ministry of Finance, it has its origins in the ministerial system introduced by Emperor Menelik II in 1907.

List of Ministers 
 Ras Mulugeta Yeggazu 1907-1915 
 Ras Bitweded Haile Giyorgis Woldemikael 1915-1917
 Fitawrari Tekle Hawariat Tekle Mariyam 1930-1935
 Makonnen Habte-Wold 1941-1957
 Yilma Deressa 1957-1970
 Mahtema Selassie Wolde Meskel 1960 (a few months)
 Mamo Taddesse 1970-1973
 Negash Desta 1974-1976
 Teferra Wolde-Semait 1976-1982
 Tesfaye Dinka 1983-1986
 Bekele Tamirat 1986 (15 days)
 Wolle Chekol 1986-1988
 Tekolla Dejene 1988-1990
 Woldemariam Girma 1990 (a few months)
 Alemayehu Dhaba 1990-1994
 Sufian Ahmed 1994–2016
 Abdulaziz Mohammed 2016
 Abraham Tekeste 2016-2018
 Ahmed Shide 2018–Present
Source:

See also 
 Central Statistical Agency (Ethiopia)

References

External links 
 Ministry of Finance and Economic Development

Ethiopia
Finance
Ethiopia, Finance and Economic Development